William John Simmons (1903-date of death unknown) was an English athlete.

Athletics
He competed in the 220 yards at the 1930 British Empire Games for England.

Personal life
He was a salesman at the time of the 1930 Games and lived in St Peter Street, London.

References

1903 births
Year of death missing
English male sprinters
Athletes from London
Athletes (track and field) at the 1930 British Empire Games
Commonwealth Games competitors for England